Javier 'Javi' Martínez Benito (born 5 September 1989 in Nájera, La Rioja) is a Spanish footballer who plays for Náxara CD mainly as a forward.

Club career
After finishing his formation with Racing de Santander, Martínez made his first-team – and La Liga – debut on 22 March 2012, playing 34 minutes in a 0–3 away loss against Sevilla FC. He spent the vast majority of his spell with the Cantabrians registered with the B-team.

In summer 2012, Martínez signed a contract with Náxara CD in Tercera División. In the following transfer window, however, he joined Segunda División B club CD Izarra.

References

External links

La Segunda B profile 

1989 births
Living people
Spanish footballers
Footballers from La Rioja (Spain)
Association football forwards
La Liga players
Segunda División B players
Tercera División players
Rayo Cantabria players
Racing de Santander players
CD Izarra footballers